Liechtenstein competed at the Winter Olympic Games for the first time at the 1936 Winter Olympics in Garmisch-Partenkirchen, Germany.

Alpine skiing

Men

Bobsleigh

References

 Olympic Winter Games 1936, full results by sports-reference.com

Nations at the 1936 Winter Olympics
1936
Olympics, Winter